AP-1 complex subunit sigma-2 is a protein that in humans is encoded by the AP1S2 gene.

Function 

Adaptor protein complex 1 is found at the cytoplasmic face of coated vesicles located at the Golgi complex, where it mediates both the recruitment of clathrin to the membrane and the recognition of sorting signals within the cytosolic tails of transmembrane receptors. This complex is a heterotetramer composed of two large, one medium, and one small adaptin subunit. The protein encoded by this gene serves as the small subunit of this complex and is a member of the adaptin protein family. Transcript variants utilizing alternative polyadenylation signals exist for this gene.

Pathology  

Mutations of the AP1S2 gene cause the Pettigrew syndrome, which is characterized by mental retardation and additional highly variable features, including choreoathetosis, hydrocephalus, Dandy–Walker malformation, seizures, and iron or calcium deposition in the brain.

References

External links

Further reading